Dan Maag (born 19 March 1975 in Mettmann, Germany) is a German film producer.

Filmography

References

External links

German film producers
Living people
1975 births
People from Mettmann
Film people from North Rhine-Westphalia